Naval Surface Warfare Center, Indian Head Division (NSWC IHD)—also known as Naval Support Facility Indian Head—is a United States naval military installation in Charles County, Maryland, that is a NAVSEA Warfare Center (WFC) enterprise dedicated to energetics (i.e., explosives, propellants, pyrotechnics, reactive materials, and their application in propulsion systems and ordnance).  NSWC IHD began as the Naval Proving Ground, Indian Head during World War I.

As a United States Department of Defense (DoD) Energetics Center, Naval Surface Warfare Center, Indian Head Division, is a critical component of the NAVSEA Warfare Center (WFC) enterprise. One of the WFC's nine divisions, Indian Head’s mission is to research, develop, test, evaluate, and produce energetics (i.e., explosives, propellants, pyrotechnics, reactive materials, related chemicals and fuels and their application in propulsion systems and ordnance) and energetic systems for U.S. fighting forces.

As the largest DoD full-spectrum energetics facility, NSWC Indian Head employs a workforce of more than 1,900, of which more than 850 are scientists, engineers, and technicians that develop and sustain explosives, propellants, pyrotechnics, high-energy chemicals, and their application to warfighting systems. In addition, NSWC Indian Head has the largest concentration of Ph.D.'s working in Energetics in the WFC, including the highest number of synthetic chemists, detonation physicists, and formulation scientists dedicated to the energetics national competency.

The Division’s synergy and balanced capabilities address all aspects of energetics, including basic research, applied technology, technology demonstration, prototyping, engineering development, acquisition, low-rate production, in-service engineering/mishaps and failure investigations, surveillance, and demilitarization.

If the military experience problems with current weapon systems, or encounter new threats on the battlefield, Indian Head Division collaborates and provides the appropriate solution. As the U.S. Navy’s lead technical authority in the United States, NSWC Indian Head performs over 60% of all Navy energetics workload, and has an unmatched record of 13 Navy-qualified explosives transitioned into 47 Navy, Army, Air Force, and Marine Corps weapons. Seventy-five percent of all explosives deployed in U.S. weapons were developed by NSWC Indian Head.

One of ten divisions of the NAVSEA Warfare Center Enterprise, the main site for NSWC IHD is located at Naval Support Facility Indian Head, a 3,500-acre peninsula along the Potomac River in Southern Maryland, at the southern terminus of the Indian Head Highway. It also maintains operations in McAlester, OK; Colts Neck, NJ; Ogden, UT; Louisville, KY, and Picatinny, New Jersey.

Capabilities

 Energetic Systems Research Development Test & Evaluation (RDT&E), Acquisition Engineering (AE), In-Service Engineering (ISE) and Sustainment
 Energetic Systems and Material Scale-up, Manufacture and Manufacturing Technology
 Cartridge Actuated Devices, Cutters, Sounding and Specialty Devices (RDT&E), AE, ISE, Sustainment, and Manufacturing
 Weapon Simulators, Trainers, Training, Test and Diagnostic Equipment (RDT&E), AE, ISE, and Sustainment
 Energetic Safety, Environmental Technology, Logistics, and PHST (Packaging, Handling, Storage and Transportation) RDT&E, AE, ISE and Sustainment
 Conventional Ammunition Engineering and Sustainment
 Gun Systems ISE, T&E, and Integrated Logistics Support (ILS)

References

External links
Indian Head Division, Naval Surface Warfare Center

Systems command installations of the United States Navy
Buildings and structures in Charles County, Maryland
Military Superfund sites
Superfund sites in Maryland
1890 establishments in Maryland